Trabala burchardii is a moth of the family Lasiocampidae. The species was first described by Hermann Dewitz in 1881. It is found in Angola, Cameroon, Equatorial Guinea, Kenya, Nigeria and Ghana.

References
Dewitz, 1881. Afrikanische Nachtschmetterlinge. Nova acta Leopoldina Bd. 42, no. 2

Lasiocampidae
Insects of West Africa
Moths of Africa